Below is a list of newspapers published in Ireland.

National titles – currently published – English language

Daily national newspapers
{| class="sortable wikitable"
! Title !! Market type !! Publisher 
!Ownership!! Location !! Format !! Circulation (avg. paid single copies)
|-
| The Irish Sun|| National – tabloid ||News UK
||| Dublin || Tabloid || 44,074 
|-
| Irish Daily Star|| National – tabloid ||Reach plc
||| Dublin || Tabloid || 32,629 
|-
| Irish Daily Mail|| National – tabloid ||DMG Media
||| Dublin || Tabloid || 25,110 
|-
| Irish Daily Mirror|| National – tabloid ||Reach plc
||| Dublin || Tabloid || 25,231 
|-
| Irish Examiner|| National – quality ||The Irish Times
|
| Cork || Broadsheet || No longer audited 
|-
| Irish Independent|| National – quality ||Mediahuis
||| Dublin || Tabloid || No longer audited
|-
|The Herald (Ireland)|| National – tabloid ||Mediahuis
|
| Dublin || Tabloid || No longer audited
|-
| The Irish Times || National – quality || The Irish Times 
||| Dublin || Broadsheet || No longer audited 
|}

Sunday national newspapers
{| class="sortable wikitable"
! Title !! Market type !! Publisher 
!Ownership!! Location !! Format !! Circulation (avg. paid single copies)
|-
| The Sunday Times|| National – quality ||News UK
||| Dublin || Broadsheet || 65,985 
|-
| Irish Mail on Sunday|| National – tabloid ||DMG Media
||| Dublin || Tabloid || 54,952 
|-
| The Irish Sun on Sunday|| National – tabloid ||News UK
||| Dublin || Tabloid || 42,689 
|-
| The Irish Sunday Mirror|| National – tabloid ||Reach plc
|||Dublin || Tabloid || 18,750 
|-
| Sunday Independent|| National – quality ||Mediahuis
||| Dublin || Broadsheet || No longer audited
|-
| Sunday World|| National – tabloid ||Mediahuis
||| Dublin || Tabloid || No longer audited
|-
| Business Post|| National – quality || Kilcullen Kapital Partners 
||| Dublin || Broadsheet || No longer audited
|-
|Daily Star Sunday
|National – tabloid
|Reach plc
|
|London
|Tabloid
|7,181
|}

Regional titles – currently published – English language

Carlow 
 Carlow People (free newspaper published by Voice Media )
 The Nationalist (Owned by The Irish Times )

Cavan 
 The Anglo-Celt (owned by Celtic Media Group).

Clare 
 The Clare Champion (owned by the Galvin family )
 The Clare Echo 
The Clare County Express Est. 1979

Cork 
 The Avondhu – north-east Cork and neighbouring areas of Limerick, Tipperary, Waterford
 Ballincollig News – Free tabloid monthly newspaper for Ballincollig, County Cork, sister publication of Bishopstown News
 Bishopstown News – Free monthly newspaper for the Western Suburbs (mainly Bishopstown and Wilton) of Cork City
 The Carrigdhoun – Carrigaline and south-east Cork 
 Cork Independent – free Cork city- and county-based weekly newspaper
 The Cork News – free Cork city based weekly newspaper, launched 18 September 2009
 The Corkman (owned by Mediahuis)
 The Douglas Post – weekly magazine for Douglas, Cork 
 The Echo (owned by The Irish Times)
 The Mallow Star (owned by VSO Publications)
 Midleton News – A4 size fortnightly newspaper for Midleton County Cork, sister publication of Youghal News, originally free, now retails for one euro
 The Muskerry News – free 40-page A4 monthly newspaper for the Ballincollig and Blarney area
 The North City News – free 40-page A4 monthly newspaper for the northside suburbs of the city of Cork
 The Opinion (formerly The Bandon Opinion) – monthly magazine for West Cork
 The Southern Star – primarily West Cork circulation
 The Vale Star (owned by VSO Publications)
 West Cork People – free monthly newspaper for West Cork, 9,000 copies 
 Youghal News – free A4 size fortnightly newspaper for Youghal County Cork

Donegal 
 Derry People/Donegal News (owned by North West of Ireland Printing and Publishing Company ) 
 The Donegal Democrat (owned by Iconic Newspapers) 
 Donegal People’s Press (owned by Iconic Newspapers) 
 Donegal Post (owned by Iconic Newspapers) 
 Finn Valley Post (owned by Iconic Newspapers) 
 Finn Valley Voice
 Inish Times (owned by Iconic Newspapers) 
 Inishowen Independent 
 Tirconaill Tribune 
 Letterkenny People (owned by Iconic Newspapers) 
 Letterkenny Post (owned by Iconic Newspapers)

Dublin 
 Dublin Gazette (City, Fingal, West, and South editions)
 The Dublin Voice
 Dublin Inquirer (monthly print edition )
 The Echo
 Liffey Champion – south-west Dublin
 Newsgroup (Tallaght News, Clondalkin News, Lucan News, and Rathcoole & Saggart News)
 Northside News
 Southside News

Galway 
 Connacht Telegraph (owned by Celtic Media Group)
 The Connacht Tribune/Galway City Tribune (owned by Connacht Tribune Media Group)
 The Galway Advertiser
 The Tuam Herald

Kerry 
 Kenmare News – free 40-page A4 monthly newspaper for the Kenmare area
 The Kerryman (owned by Mediahuis)
 Kerry's Eye
 Killarney Advertiser - www.killarneyadvertiser.ie, weekly community news magazine since 1973

Kildare 
 Kildare Nationalist (owned by The Irish Times)
 Kildare Post (owned by Iconic Newspapers) 
 Leinster Leader (owned by Iconic Newspapers) 
 Liffey Champion – north Kildare and west Dublin

Kilkenny 
 The Kilkenny People (owned by Iconic Newspapers)
 The Kilkenny Reporter (free sheet, owned by Iconic Newspapers, not connected with closed newspaper of the similar name Kilkenny Reporter).
 The Kilkenny Observer (free sheet, owned by Amici Sempre Ltd)

Laois 
 Laois Nationalist (owned by The Irish Times )
 The Leinster Express (owned by Iconic Newspapers)

Leitrim 
 Leitrim Observer (owned by Iconic Newspapers)

Limerick 
 Limerick Leader (owned by Iconic Newspapers) 
 Limerick Post – free paper
 Vale Star (published by VSO Publications )
 Weekly Observer (published by VSO Publications )

Longford 
 Longford Leader (owned by Iconic Newspapers )

Louth 
 The Argus (owned by Mediahuis)
 The Drogheda Independent (owned by Mediahuis)
 Drogheda Leader 
 The Dundalk Democrat (owned by Iconic Newspapers) 
 The Dundalk Leader

Mayo 
 Connaught Telegraph (owned by Celtic Media Group)
 Mayo Advertiser
 The Mayo News
 Western People (owned by The Irish Times)

Meath 
 The Meath Chronicle (owned by Celtic Media Group)
 The Meath Topic

Monaghan 
 The Northern Standard

Offaly 
 The Offaly Topic
 The Midland Tribune (owned by Iconic Newspapers) 
 The Offaly Independent (owned by Celtic Media Group)
 Tullamore Tribune (owned by Iconic Newspapers)

Roscommon 
 Athlone Advertiser (variant of Galway Advertiser) 
 Roscommon Herald (owned by The Irish Times)
 Roscommon People

Sligo 
 The Northwest Express
 The Sligo Champion (owned by Mediahuis)
 Sligo Weekender (owned by Dorothy Crean)

Tipperary 
 The Midland Tribune (owned by Iconic Newspapers)
 The Nationalist (owned by Iconic Newspapers) 
 The Nenagh Guardian
 The Tipperary Star (owned by Iconic Newspapers )

Waterford 
 The Dungarvan Leader
 The Dungarvan Observer
 The Munster Express
 Waterford News & Star (Owned by The Irish Times)
 Waterford Today (free newspaper, owned by Voice Media )

Westmeath 
 Athlone Advertiser
 The Athlone Topic
 Westmeath Examiner (owned by Celtic Media Group)
 Westmeath Independent (owned by Celtic Media Group)
 Westmeath Topic

Wexford 
 The County Wexford Free Press
 The Enniscorthy Guardian (owned by Mediahuis)
 The Gorey Guardian (owned by Mediahuis)
 The New Ross Standard (owned by Mediahuis)
 The Wexford People (owned by Mediahuis)

Wicklow 
 Bray People (owned by Mediahuis)
 North Wicklow Times
 South Wicklow Times
 Wicklow People (owned by Mediahuis)
 Wicklow Voice (free newspaper, owned by Voice Media)

Political newspapers
 An Phoblacht – irregular magazine politically aligned to Sinn Féin
 Irish Republican News – online weekly newspaper
 Saoirse Irish Freedom – monthly newspaper aligned to Republican Sinn Féin
 The Socialist – monthly newspaper politically aligned to the Socialist Party
 Socialist Voice – monthly newspaper published by the Communist Party of Ireland
 Socialist Worker – bi-weekly newspaper aligned to the Socialist Workers Party
The Sovereign Nation - bi-monthly newspaper aligned to the 32 County Sovereignty Movement
 The Starry Plough – bi-monthly newspaper politically aligned to the Irish Republican Socialist Party

Pan-regional
 The Avondhu – covers North East Cork, West Waterford, South Limerick and South Tipperary
 The Munster Express – covers the South East
 The Nationalist & Munster Advertiser
 Northwest Express – covers the 8 Northwest counties

University newspapers

Cork
 UCC Express – University College Cork

Dublin
 College Tribune – University College Dublin
 The College View – Dublin City University
 The Edition – Dublin Institute of Technology
 Trinity News – Trinity College Dublin
 The University Observer – University College Dublin
 The University Times – Trinity College Dublin

Galway
 Sin Newspaper – National University of Ireland, Galway

Limerick
 An Focal – University of Limerick

Minority newspapers
 Metro Éireann – multicultural paper for immigrants and ethnic minorities
(See also below in Foreign-language newspapers)

Online
 TheJournal.ie
 Broadsheet.ie
 TheIBB.org

Other
 Iris Oifigiúil – official state gazette
 The Irish Catholic
 Irish Farmers Journal
 The Irish Field

Irish-language newspapers

Weekly newspapers
 Seachtain – Irish language newspaper which eventually replaced Foinse, included with the Wednesday Irish Independent
 Goitse – local weekly Irish language newspaper for the Gaeltacht parish of Gweedore.

Monthly newspapers
 Saol – Irish language monthly newspaper based in Dublin

Defunct
In the past there was one daily newspaper:

 Lá Nua, based in Belfast

There were two weekly newspapers:

 Gaelscéal – previously available every Friday
 Foinse – was distributed Wednesdays with the Irish Independent, replaced by Seachtain

College newspapers with columns in Irish

 The University Times (Trinity College Dublin student newspaper)
 UCC Express (University College Cork student newspaper)
 The College Tribune (University College Dublin Student Newspaper) – Irish Section
 The Edition  (Dublin Institute of Technology student newspaper)
 An Focal  (University of Limerick student newspaper)
 The College View  (Dublin City University student newspaper)

Online newspapers
 Tuairisc.ie

English-language papers with regular Irish-language columns

Many English-language newspapers have Irish-language columns, including:

 An Phoblacht
 Irish Independent – on Wednesdays includes the newspaper Seachtain
 Connaught Telegraph
 Evening Echo – weekly Irish-language segment
 Irish Echo
 Irish Daily Star (column on Saturdays)
 Irish News
 The Irish Times
 Metro Éireann

Other languages

Catalan
 Diari Liffey – news from Ireland in Catalan

Russian
 Наша Газета (Nasha Gazeta) – paper targeted at speakers of the Russian language

Polish
 Nasz Glos
 Polska Gazeta
 Polski Express
 Polski Herald – special Polish edition of every Friday's Evening Herald
 StrefaÉire – Polish language newspaper for the Polish community in Ireland

Closed newspapers, no longer published

Daily 
 An Claidheamh Soluis – "The Sword of Light", see Gaelic League
 Cork Constitution – renamed 1873, ceased publication 1922
 Cork Free Press – founded 1910, ceased publication 1916
 The Clare Courier
 Daily Express – founded 1851, ceased general publication 1921
 Daily Ireland – launched in January 2005, ceased in September 2006
 The Daily News – opened and closed in 1982
 The Dublin Evening Mail – renamed the Evening Mail, closed in the 1960s
 The Evening News – opened in May 1996 and closed in September of the same year
 The Evening Press – closed in 1995
 The Evening Telegraph – closed 1924
 The Freeman's Journal – merged with the Irish Independent in 1924
 Irish Bulletin – official Irish Republic gazette; closed 1922
 The Irish Press – closed in 1995
 Limerick Standard
Lá – the first Irish Gaelic medium daily paper, renamed Lá Nua, closed in 2008

Sunday and weekly 
 Anois – closed in 1996
 Inniú – closed in 1984
 Ireland on Sunday – replaced with Irish Mail on Sunday 2006
 The Irish Citizen – closed 1920
 Irish Daily Star Sunday – closed January 2011
 The Irish Family – closed 2008
 An Gaedheal – closed 1937
 Irish News of the World – closed July 2011
 The Sunday Journal
 The Sunday Press – closed in 1995
 Sunday Review – published in Dublin 1957–1963
 The Sunday Tribune – closed February 2011
 The United Irishman – founded 1899; closed 1906

Regional 
 Athlone Voice (Now closed )
 Ballymun Concrete News
 The Cashel Advertiser
 The Cashel Gazette
 The Cavan Echo
 The Cavan Voice
 The Clare People
 The Clonmel Chronicle
 The Clonmel Herald
 The Clonmel Journal
 Connemara View – ceased publication in December 2010
 The Cork on Sunday – short-lived (late 1990s) Sunday newspaper for Metropolitan Cork
 The Cork Weekly – a free weekly paper for Metropolitan Cork incorporating the Douglas Weekly, ceased July 2009
 The Corkonian
 Donegal on Sunday
 Donegal Times (Closed in 2017 ) 
 The Dublin Daily – renamed the Dublin Evening, a daily paper started in 2003 that ran for four months before running out of money
 Dublin Penny Journal
 The Dungarvan People and The Waterford People  – sister papers, existed in 2008
 The East Cork Express
 East Cork Journal – launched September 2007. Ceased publication in 2020 during pandemic lockdown.
 The East Cork News – discontinued in 1991 after several years, was a sister publication of the Waterford News and Star (owned by Examiner/TCH)
 The East Cork Post – short-lived Youghal based newspaper in the mid-1980s
 The East Galway Democrat
 The Enniscorthy Echo
 Fingal Independent (owned by Independent News and Media )
 The Flying Post - First regular Dublin newspaper from 1699, mainly a reprint of a similar London newspaper
 The Galway Vindicator
 Galway First
 Galway Voice
 Galway Independent
 The Gorey Echo’’
 Herald AM
 Imokilly Monthly – a monthly newspaper in East Cork which appeared during 2009, a descendant of a previous publication, the Imokilly People
 Imokilly People – circulated in East Cork and South-West Waterford. Previously existed 1989 – July 2007 and reappeared briefly under new ownership in late 2008
 The Kildare Voice
 Kilkenny Advertiser – free newspaper
 The Kilkenny Voice
 The Kingdom
 The Leitrim Echo
 Letterkenny Leader – became the Letterkenny Post in 2005
 The Liffey Voice
 The Limerick Reporter
 Limerick Chronicle
 Limerick Independent
 Longford News (Now closed )
 The Meath Echo
 The Meath Post
 The Meath Telegraph
 The Meath Weekender
 Metro
 Midleton Post – existed from February until sometime in 2008
 Monaghan Post
 The Monaghan Voice
 The Mullingar Advertiser
 The Muskerry Herald – Ballincollig, County Cork
 North County Leader (Closed in 2017 )
 The Naas Voice
 The New Ross Echo
 The Offaly Express
 Roscommon Champion (Now closed) 
 The Democrat (Roscommon)(Newspaper stopped/disrupted by court action )
 The Roscrea People
 The Skibbereen Eagle – incorporated into The Southern Star
 The Sligo Independent – published in Sligo 1855–1921; changed name to Sligo Independent and West of Ireland Advertiser 1921–1961
 The Sligo Journal – sister paper of the Western Journal, published for Sligo 1977–1983
 The Sligo Post
 The Northside People  (49.9% owned by Celtic Media Group)
 The Southside People (49.9% owned by Celtic Media Group) 
 Tallaght Voice
 The Tipperary Advocate
 The Tipperary Free Press
 The Tipperary Leader
 The Tipperary Vindicator
 The Tipperary Voice
 The Tipperaryman
 The Waterford Chronicle (1804–1872)
 The Waterford People and The Dungarvan People – sister papers, existed in 2008
 The Western Journal
 The Wexford Echo
 The Youghal Tribune – sister newspaper of the Dungarvan Observer
  The Cavan Times

See also
 List of online newspaper archives
 Radio in Ireland
 Television in Ireland

References

External links
 Newspaper Database National Library of Ireland – Irish newspaper index and archives



Lists of companies of Ireland
Newspapers, Republic
Ireland
Lists of organisations based in the Republic of Ireland